Alfred Gambier Newman  (18 January 1875 – 18 January 1921) was an Australian architect active in the first 20 years of the 20th century. He designed significant work for both the Methodist Church and the Newman and Vickery families.

Early life
Newman was born in Mount Gambier, South Australia, one of eight children of Emma Ann (née Fisher) and the Rev. Charles Thomas Newman. He was educated at Prince Alfred College (PAC), Adelaide (1887–1890) where his art master was James Ashton. After leaving PAC, Newman studied art and design at the South Australian School of Art. In 1896 his mother died in Kapunda. In 1900 his father married Elizabeth Vickery, the daughter of Ebenezer Vickery, merging two prominent Methodist families.

Architect
Newman worked as an architect in Adelaide and became an Associate of the South Australian Institute of Architects in 1898. He advertised in The Advertiser as "Alfred G Newman A.S.A.I.A. Architect" of Augusta Street Glenelg, South Australia and later in King William Street, Adelaide before moving to Sydney in 1906. He resigned from the South Australian Roll of Architects in 1909.

Marriage and family
Newman and his wife lived at Ingleburn, Kingsland Road,  Strathfield, and had three daughters, one stillborn. He died at home in Strathfield in 1921.

Church commissions
From the time Newman moved to Sydney he was a superintendent of the Sunday school at the Strathfield Methodist Church and over a period of 15 years did a substantial amount of design work for the church. His buildings include:

Churches
 Auburn Methodist Church (now Uniting Church) corner of Helena and Harrow Streets, Auburn, New South Wales;
 Barraba Methodist Church, Barraba, New South Wales;
 Beecroft Methodist Church (now Uniting Church), Beecroft Road Beecroft, New South Wales;
 Blackheath Methodist Church (now Uniting Church) 43-45 Govetts Leap Road, Blackheath, New South Wales;
 Dee Why Methodist Church (now Cecil Gribble Uniting Church) 60 Howard Avenue Dee Why, New South Wales;
 Epping Methodist Church, Epping, New South Wales;
 Hurlstone Park Methodist (now Uniting Church) 8 Melford Street Hurlstone Park, New South Wales;
 Kempsey Methodist Church, Kempsey, New South Wales;
 Lakemba Methodist Church (now Uniting Church) The Boulevarde, Lakemba, New South Wales;
 Manilla Methodist Church (now Uniting Church) Strafford Street, Manilla, New South Wales;
 North Ryde Methodist Church, North Ryde, New South Wales;
 Rhodes Methodist Church, Rhodes, New South Wales;
 Strathfield Methodist Church (now Carrington Avenue Uniting Church) 13 Carrington Avenue, Strathfield, New South Wales;
 Tighes Hill Methodist Church, Tighes Hill, New South Wales;
 Young Methodist Church, Young, New South Wales;
 The Warren Methodist Church, Illawarra Road, Marrickville, New South Wales;
 Wentworthville Methodist Church, Wentworthville, New South Wales;
 Woodford Methodist Church (now abandoned) 68 Great Western Highway, Woodford, New South Wales;
 Wyalong Methodist Church, Wyalong, New South Wales.

For the Church of Christ he designed:
 Marrickville Church of Christ, 389 Illawarra Road Marrickville, New South Wales.

Church school halls
 Campsie Methodist Church School Hall, Campsie, New South Wales;
 Epping Methodist Church School Hall, Epping, New South Wales.

Parsonages
 Croydon Park Methodist Parsonage, Croydon Park, New South Wales;
 Granville Methodist Parsonage, Granville, New South Wales;
 Woodford Methodist Parsonage (now a private house) 69 Great Western Highway, Woodford, New South Wales.

Commercial
 Shop and Residence (in front of Uniting Church Hall) 282-284 King Street, Newtown, New South Wales.
 Former Joseph Vickery & Co Building (1908 Scientology House) 201 Castlereagh Street, Sydney

Houses
The following house designs are attributed to Newman:
 Tiptree 1906 (later Eva Horden Red Cross Home, demolished 1954) Cnr Llandilo Avenue and Kingsland Road Strathfield, New South Wales, built for Newman's father, Rev. C T Newman, and his wife Elizabeth, a daughter of Ebenezer Vickery
 Lauriston 1907 (now Santa Maria Del Monte School) Cnr The Boulevarde and Margaret Street Strathfield, New South Wales, built for Amy Alfreda Vickery, a daughter of Ebenezer Vickery
 Ingleburn 1908 13–15 Kingsland Road Strathfield, built by Newman as his own home
 Wych Hazel 1911 (demolished 2014) 20 Livingstone Street Burwood, New South Wales, built for Oswald Aubrey Parker and his wife Sylvia Jane, a granddaughter of Ebenezer Vickery
 Camden Lodge 1917 (burnt out 2012) 98–102 Burlington Road Homebush, New South Wales, built as Canlidgy for Robert Trevethan

Apartments

 Chelmsford Hall 1912 (redeveloped 2019) 6 Montague Street, Balmain, New South Wales, built as a Temperance Hall in 1912

References

1875 births
1921 deaths
Architects from Sydney
New South Wales architects
Australian Methodists
People educated at Prince Alfred College